Samuel Rogers (1763–1855) was an English poet.

Samuel Rogers may also refer to:

 Samuel Rogers (clergyman) (1789–1877), American Restoration Movement pioneer
 Samuel Augustus Rogers (1840–1911), Irish-born merchant and political figure in British Columbia
 Samuel F. Rogers (1834–1905), American sailor and Medal of Honor recipient
 Samuel St. George Rogers (1832–1880), Confederate politician

See also
 Sam Rogers (disambiguation)
 Samuel Rodgers (1894–1970), unionist politician in Northern Ireland
 Samuel R. Rodgers (1798–1866), Tennessee state legislator and judge